Salí River is the most important river in the Argentine province of Tucumán.

The river is born from the precipitations capture by the Calchaquíes range next to Salta Province, and its water flow is increased by the numerous streams from the Sierra del Aconquija range, and other rivers.

Most cities and town in the province, included the capital San Miguel de Tucumán, lay on the basin of this river, which continues to Santiago del Estero Province with the name of Dulce River, and dies at the Mar Chiquita lagoon in Córdoba Province.

3 main dams have been constructed both for the production of hydroelectric energy and irrigation; two in the Tucumán Province: El Cadillal and Escaba, and Los Quiroga in Santiago del Estero Province.

Rivers of Argentina
Rivers of Tucumán Province